Lalisa may refer to:
Lalisa (single album), the debut single album by Thai rapper and singer Lisa
"Lalisa" (song), the debut single by Lisa
Lalisa Manobal or Lisa (born 1997), Thai rapper and singer

See also
La Lisa, municipality in Havana, Cuba